Anne Hart Gilbert  (1768–1834) was a Methodist writer, teacher and abolitionist. She is known as one of the Hart sisters, alongside Elizabeth Hart Thwaites.

Selected works
 Memoir of John Gilbert, 1835

References

1768 births
1834 deaths
Antigua and Barbuda women writers
Methodist abolitionists
19th-century non-fiction writers
Women memoirists